Blakeney Guildhall is a building in the coastal village of Blakeney in the north of the county of Norfolk. The property is in the care of English Heritage but is managed by the local parish council. Blakeney is just off the A149 coast road and is nine miles west of Sheringham. The property can be found in an alley just off the quay. It is a scheduled monument.

Origins
The building has always traditionally been called the Guildhall but nothing is known of its early history. It is likely to have originally been built for a prosperous medieval Blakeney fish merchant, the undercroft being used for storage of his merchandise. The building later became the guildhall of Blakeney's guild of fish merchants.
The Guildhall was once a two-storey building  but now all that remains is the 14th-century brick-vaulted undercroft. It is divided into two aisles by a row of stone piers which support the ribbed vaults of brickwork. The doorway and the windows are all original. The bricks, no doubt, were locally made and are typical of their period, being of variable shape, quality and appearance. For this reason brickwork of this period was often plastered over.
The main building was entered from higher ground on the southern land side of the building. A projection at the south-east corner contains the shute that served a garderobe or privy.

Ownership
It is believed that the Guildhall was once owned by the Carmelite Friary that stood nearby. It has been in the ownership of the village for over 400 years. There is a series of deeds recording the transfer of ownership from one group of trustees to the next. Each deed provides for the Guildhall to be used for the benefit of the villagers of Blakeney. The first surviving deed dates from 1627. There are other similar deeds dated 1687, 1750 and 1808. Subsequent deeds do not appear to have survived. Over the years the basement has been used for the storage of cargo, as a grain store, coal bunker, for growing mushrooms and also a worm and bait store for local fishermen. During the war years the basement was used as a mortuary for drowned sailors.

Gallery

See also

 Guild
 Guildhall Museum

References

External links

 Official page: English Heritage

Blakeney, Norfolk
North Norfolk
English Heritage sites in Norfolk
Houses in Norfolk
Buildings and structures in Norfolk